Gores Island, also known as Gore's Island, is an island in Strangford Lough, County Down, Northern Ireland. It is connected to nearby Castle Island, and thence to the mainland, by a narrow roadway (causeway) that is passable only at low tides. It has been inhabited previously, but has had no residents since the early 20th century.

Location and geography
Gores Island is located at the southern end of Strangford Lough, in an inlet formed by the mouth of the Quoile River. It is north of the town of Downpatrick, south of Killyleagh and adjacent to Salt Island to the north east and Castle Island to the south west. At low tide, the shoreline of the island is surrounded by an area of exposed soft mud, which can be treacherous.

History
Amongst the island's last inhabitants were farmer Samuel Spratt, who died in 1898, and his widow Jane Spratt, who died on the island in 1910 at the age of 98, having lived there for seventy years. In the 1940s and 1950s, having been uninhabited for several decades, the island was used as a summer-camp venue for boys and girls from Industrial Schools and borstals such as the Malone Training School in Belfast. In recent years the island has been used by the nearby Quoile Yacht Club for an annual "Gore's Island Race".

Flora and fauna
The island features a number of butterfly features, including Pieris rapae, Pieris napi, the Small tortoiseshell (Aglais urticae), Aglais io, and Vanessa cardui.

References

Islands of County Down
Uninhabited islands of Northern Ireland